(S)-corytuberine synthase is a cytochrome P450 enzyme purified from the plant Coptis japonica (Japanese goldthread), with EC number  and CYP Symbol CYP80G2 (Cytochrome P450, family 80, member G2), and catalyses an intramolecular C-C phenol coupling of (S)-reticuline in magnoflorine biosynthesis.

References 

EC 1.14.19
80